Renaud Paulian (28 May 1913, Neuilly-sur-Seine -  16 August 2003, Bordeaux) was a 
French naturalist . He was a specialist in  Coleoptera notably  Scarabaeoidea.

References
Aberlenc, H.-P. 2003: Hommage à Renaud Paulian obsèques à Bordeaux, le lundi 25 août 2003, au temple de la rue du Ha. L'Entomologiste. Revue d'Amateurs, Paris 59 (4), S. 113
Allemand, R. 2003: Necrologie: Renaud Paulian. Bulletin mensuel de la Société Linnéenne de Lyon, Lyon 72 (9), S. 292, 
Cambefort, Y. 2008 Renaud Paulian (1913-2003): un naturaliste extraordinaire. Zoosystema, Paris 30 (3), S. 749–756, B15 10185
Lhoste, J. 1987: Les entomologistes français. 1750 - 1950. INRA (Institut National de la Recherche Agronomique), 1-355 
 Viette, P. 2003: In memoriam Renaud Paulian (1913 - 2003). Bulletin de la Société Entomologique de France, Paris 108 (4), S. 329-332
Groll, E. K. (2017). Biographies of the Entomologists of the World. Online database, version 8. Senckenberg Deutsches Entomologisches Institut, Müncheberg

French entomologists
Presidents of the Société entomologique de France
2003 deaths
1913 births
20th-century French zoologists